Shitrit, Sheetrit, Shitreet, Chitrit, Chetrit, Chettrit, also related to Benchetrit, Benshitreet, Ben Shitrit (Hebrew: , Arabic) is a Moroccan surname (family name) of Berber Jewish origin, well known among Moroccan Jews, especially in Israel, France and Canada. The original pronunciation in Moroccan Arabic is Sh-t-ret. The French spell is Chettrit which is the most acceptable spelling for this name. Many people within the Moroccan Jewish diaspora hold this family name.

Notable people
Nir Shitrit - Professor, School of Electrical & Computer Engineering, Ben-Gurion University of the Negev, world renown expert of meta-engineering of light in the linear, nonlinear and quantum optical regimes
Samuel Chitrit - international tax expert
Bechor-Shalom Sheetrit, Israeli minister
Meir Sheetrit
Ofer Shitrit
Joseph Chetrit
Ofir Ben Shitrit - religious singer
Ori Shitrit
Sami Shalom Chetrit, Moroccan-born Israeli writer and poet
Shimon Shetreet, Israeli professor
Samuel Benchetrit, French actor

Berber Jews
Maghrebi Jewish surnames
Sephardic surnames
Surnames of Moroccan origin